Masar may refer to:

People 
Masar (surname)
 Masar Caka (1946–2000), Albanian painter
 Masar Ömer (born 1993), Finnish footballer

Other
 Masar (horse), an Irish-bred racehorse
 Maşar Dasht, a village in Iran
 Masar Ghan, a village in Iran

See also 

 Masr (disambiguation)
 Massar (disambiguation)